Theodore Alois William Buckley (1825–1856) was a translator of Homer and other classical works.

In 1852 Buckley published the book "The great cities of the ancient world in their glory and their desolation". This book depicts stories, descriptions and legends surrounding the great ancient cities. The book has had many revisions and new editions, two of which were in the first year of publishing, one of which included illustrations. The third edition was published in 1855 and new editions followed in 1858, 1864, 1878 and 1896.

In 1851 his literal prose translation of Homer's Odyssey, with explanatory notes, was published in Bohn's Classical Library series.  In 1873 he published a literal prose translation of the complete text of The Iliad, in which he included explanatory notes. 
 
He was the son of William Richard Buckley of Paddington, London, Great Britain and matriculated from Christ Church, Oxford in 1845 (BA 1849, MA 1853).

References

Sources 
 Alumni Oxoniensis:  The Members of The University of Oxford, 1715 - 1886:  Their Parentage

External links

 
 
 
 Theodore Alois Buckley's translation of The Iliad on Project Gutenberg

1825 births
1856 deaths
British translators
Translators of Ancient Greek texts
Translators of Homer